Ordine Nuovo (Italian for "New Order", full name Centro Studi Ordine Nuovo, "New Order Scholarship Center") was an Italian far right cultural and extra-parliamentary political and paramilitary organization founded by Pino Rauti in 1956. It had been the most important extra-parliamentary neofascist organization of the post-war Italian republic.

The name is shared by Movimento Politico Ordine Nuovo, a splinter group of Centro Studi Ordine Nuovo.

The organization, considered as an attempt at reforming the Fascist Party (banned by the Constitution), was forcibly dissolved by the Italian government in 1973. Remaining elements of the group formed the Ordine Nero (Black Order) in 1974.

Members and a leader of Movimento Politico Ordine Nuovo participated in several terrorist attacks. These include the 1969 Piazza Fontana bombing and the 1970 Rome-Messina train attack.

History
Previously, L'Ordine Nuovo ("The New Order") had been the name of a radical left-wing paper edited by Antonio Gramsci in the early 1920s, with Gramsci's followers being nicknamed "ordinovisti". However, later on the term—in Italian and various other languages—was appropriated by Fascists and Nazis, its original left-wing predecessors forgotten.

The extreme right-wing organization here referred to, whose members were also nicknamed ordinovisti, though being the political opposite of the earlier ones, was born from an internal current and then a schism in the Movimento Sociale Italiano (MSI). In 1954 Arturo Michelini, a moderate seeking an alliance with the Italian Monarchic Party, and possibly with the Christian Democracy, became general secretary of the MSI. This led to the schism of the most intransigent and spiritualist, Evolian current (Nazism was also a reference), led by Pino Rauti, Lello Graziani and Sergio Baldassini. They refused any compromise that brought the party apart from aristocratic principles. The intransigent and spiritualist Ordine Nuovo was then founded in Rome, but still a part of the MSI.

The real break with MSI happened at the MSI congress in Milan in 1956.  Pino Rauti declared that, being disappointed with the moderate drift of the MSI, his movement would abandon the political scene, creating the "Centro Studi Ordine Nuovo", an association dedicated to "political studies and analysis". This wanted to be a literal application of the theses of Julius Evola, that is, an aristocratic refusal of contemporary, materialist society. Ordine Nuovo, nonetheless, had a capillary and hierarchical organization on the Italian territory, and often behaved more like an extra-parliamentary political organization than a simple "scholarship center".

Splinter group 

In the 1969, Rauti, along with most of Ordine Nuovo, came back in the MSI party, then led by Giorgio Almirante. The remaining hardliners founded Movimento Politico Ordine Nuovo ("New Order Political Movement").

The motto of Ordine Nuovo was Il nostro onore si chiama fedeltà, or "Our honour is named loyalty", also the motto of the Waffen SS (Meine Ehre heißt Treue). The symbol of the organization was a double-head axe.

Implication in terrorist attacks 
Several members of Movimento Politico Ordine Nuovo, including one of its leaders, Pierluigi Concutelli, participated in terrorist attacks.

1969 Piazza Fontana bombing and 1970 Rome-Messina train attack 
On 12 December 1969, unknown indivuduals placed a bomb in Piazza Fontana in Milan, killing 16 and wounding 90. This bombing marked the beginning of the "strategy of tension" in Italy. At various times groups from both left and right have been accused of being behind the attack. Ordine Nuovo member Delfo Zorzi was among those convicted for the crime on June 20, 2001, together with Carlo Maria Maggi and Giancarlo Rognoni, but all were later found not guilty in 2004.

In July 1970, members of Ordine Nuovo bombed the Rome-Messina train, killing 6 and wounding 100.

Notable members 
Pierluigi Concutelli (leader of underground armed unit)
Carlo Cicuttini (member)
Delfo Zorzi (member)
Pino Rauti (founder)
Vincenzo Vinciguerra (member)
Franco Freda (senior member)

See also 
Franco Freda (sympathizer)
Konstantinos Plevris (sympathizer)
Operation Gladio
1969 Piazza Fontana bombing
1974 Piazza della Loggia bombing
Armed, far-right organizations in Italy

References

External links
Anthem of Ordine Nuovo

Defunct organisations designated as terrorist in Italy
Factions of the Years of Lead (Italy)
Neo-fascist organisations in Italy
Neo-fascist terrorism